Tennis is one of the most popular sports in Romania. The Romanian Tennis Federation ( or FRT), a member of ITF, is the sport's national governing body.

History
Tennis was introduced to Romania in the late 19th century by students returning from their time abroad.

Also, the Romania Davis Cup team made the finals of the competition in three editions: 3 (1969, 1971 and 1972) losing each time by the hands of the United States Davis Cup team.

Men's tennis saw its best period during  the beginning of the Open Era when Ilie Năstase reached the number 1 ranking in 1973 after winning the US Open in 1972 and the French Open in 1973.

Women's tennis, in particular, has seen tremendous successes both in the 20th and 21st centuries, with the advent of Florența Mihai, Virginia Ruzici, Irina Spîrlea and Simona Halep. Three of these women reached the Top 10 of the WTA rankings in singles, namely Ruzici, Spîrlea and Halep whilst Mihai, Ruzici and Halep reached Grand Slam finals with Ruzici winning the French Open in 1978 and Halep winning the same tournament in 2018.

Tournaments held in Romania on the men's tour every year included Romanian Open from 1993 until 2016. The women have the Bucharest Open held between 2014 and 2019, and the Transylvania Open from 2021.

List of Romanian singles tennis players (Open Era only) 
Only includes players ranked in the top 100. Bold names indicate currently active players

Men

Women

List of Romanian doubles tennis players (Open Era only) 
Only includes players ranked in the top 100 or that have won at least one ATP or WTA title. Bold names indicate currently active players

Men

Women

See also
Sport in Romania
Romania Davis Cup team
Romania Fed Cup team

References

External links
Romanian Tennis Federation (Official site)